True to Myself is the debut album of R&B singer Eric Benét. Records on September 24, 1996 in the United States. It was his first outing as a solo artist after the dissolution of his former group Benét, which he formed with his sister Lisa Jordan and cousin George Nash, Jr. Benét received his deal with Warner Bros. Records from former EMI Records executive Alison Ball-Gabriel after corporate shakeups caused his former group to be dropped by the record label.

Benet produced most of his debut with Demonté Posey and George Nash, Jr., both of whom would work with him on his later recordings. In 1995, he released the song "Let's Stay Together", which originally appeared on the soundtrack of the 1996 Martin Lawrence film A Thin Line Between Love and Hate. The music video to the song was directed by Charles Stone III. The second single released from True to Myself was the McG directed "Spiritual Thang". The album's biggest hit was the third single "Femininity", which was directed by a then-unknown Francis Lawrence. "Femininity" also featured an appearance from then-unknown rapper Tiye Phoenix, who played a pregnant woman in the music video. The title track was the fourth and final single released from the album with a video directed by Joseph Kahn.

Critical reception

AllMusic editor Leo Stanley called found that "the album suffers from inconsistent material which prevents it from being a thoroughly impressive debut. As it stands, True to Myself is merely an appealing, promising collection of soul that usually straddles the line between classic and urban soul quite skillfully."

Track listing

Personnel
Credits adapted from liner notes.

Performers and musicians

 George Nash, Jr. – Guitar, Drums, Clavinet
 Demonte Posey – Keyboards, Drums, Melodica
 Mark Lomax – Drums
 Warren Crawford – Bass
 Rio – Bass
 Skeeta – Bass, Guitar
 Gumby – Guitar
 Eric "Kenya" Baker – Guitar
 Christian Warren – Keyboards, Drums, Fender Rhodes, Piano
 Curtis "Sauce" Wilson – Drums
 Roger Troutman – Keyboards, Bass, Guitar, Vocoder
 Tyrone W. Griffin – Trumpet
 Fernando Harkless – Saxophone
 Steve Baxter – Trombone
 Barbara "Bobbi" Schneider – Violin
 Paul Gminder – Cello
 Eric Benét, Lisa Jordan-Weathers – Background vocals
 Alison Ball-Gabriel – Executive Producer
 Recording engineer – Eric Benét, Demonte Posey and George Nash, Jr., Roger Troutman, Hilary Bercovici, Skeeta
 Mixing: Eric Benét, Demonte Posey and George Nash, Jr., Kevin "K.D." Davis, Roger Troutman, Hilary Bercovici, Skeeta
 Mastering: Brian Gardner
 Brad Hitz – Photography
 Terry Robertson, Stephen Walker – Art Direction
 Stephen Walker – Design

Charts

Release history

References

1996 debut albums
Eric Benét albums
Warner Records albums
Funk albums by American artists